The Crisscross Shadow is Volume 32 in the original The Hardy Boys Mystery Stories published by Grosset & Dunlap.

This book was written for the Stratemeyer Syndicate by Richard Cohen in 1953. Between 1959 and 1973 the first 38 volumes of this series were systematically revised as part of a project directed by Harriet Adams, Edward Stratemeyer's daughter. The original version of this book was shortened in 1969 by Priscilla Baker-Carr resulting in two slightly different stories sharing the same title.

Plot summary
The Hardy boys find the missing deed to an Indian's land, prevent a phony salesman from carrying through a reckless scheme, and help their father solve a top-secret sabotage case.

References

The Hardy Boys books
1953 American novels
1953 children's books
1969 American novels
1969 children's books
Grosset & Dunlap books